Phil Devey (born May 31, 1977) is a Canadian former professional baseball pitcher who played internationally for Team Canada in the 2004 Summer Olympics.

Amateur career
Devey graduated from the University of Louisiana at Lafayette (then known as the University of Southwestern Louisiana). In 1998, he played collegiate summer baseball with the Wareham Gatemen of the Cape Cod Baseball League, where he was named a league all-star and received the league's Outstanding Pitcher award.

Professional career
Devey was selected in the 5th round of the 1999 MLB Draft by the Los Angeles Dodgers, and played in the Dodgers system at Yakima, San Bernardino, Vero Beach, Jacksonville and Las Vegas from 1999 to 2003.  

Devey played with San Antonio of the Texas League in 2004, the AA affiliate of the Seattle Mariners, then in 2005 with both the Portland Sea Dogs, the AA affiliate of the Boston Red Sox, and the AA affiliate of the Philadelphia Phillies, the Reading Phillies, both of the Eastern League.

International career
Devey was a member of Team Canada in the 2004 Summer Olympics. The team finished in fourth place, and Devey pitched six scoreless innings against Australia in an 11-0 round-robin win.

References

External links

1977 births
Anglophone Quebec people
Baseball people from Quebec
Baseball players at the 2004 Summer Olympics
Canadian baseball players
Living people
Olympic baseball players of Canada
People from Lachute
Portland Sea Dogs players
Yakima Bears players
San Bernardino Stampede players 
Vero Beach Dodgers players
Jacksonville Suns players
Long Island Ducks players
Chattanooga Lookouts players
Las Vegas 51s players
Pensacola Pelicans players
San Antonio Missions players
Reading Phillies players
University of Louisiana at Lafayette alumni
Wareham Gatemen players